Hayal Köseoğlu (born December 20, 1992) is a Turkish television, theater actress 
and musician best known for her roles Açelya in Mucize Doktor and Sasha in Mahkum.

Life and career 
Hayal Köseoğlu was born on December 20, 1992 in Istanbul. She completed her education at Istanbul Aydın University, Faculty of Fine Arts, Department of Drama and Acting. Köseoğlu, who met acting at a young age, had her first acting experience in the fantasy comedy series Ruhsar series broadcast on Kanal D at the age of 6. She also appeared in the TV series Mahallenin Muhtarları, Aşk-ı Memnu, Muhteşem Yüzyıl on Star TV, Arkadaşlar İyidir on Show TV, İstanbullu Gelin on Star TV, and Mucize Doktor on FOX. As of 2022, she plays Sasha in Fox's Mahkum. Her web series Cezailer is coming soon to the digital platform Gain.

Filmography

Web series

Tv series

Movies

References 
 ^ "Hayal Köseoğlu, evinin bahçesinde dans etti". Sözcü. Archived from the original on 31 May 2020
 ^ "Oyuncu Hayal Köseoğlu'nun direk dans videosu Instagram'ı sallıyor". Haberler.com. 28 Nov 2020. Archived from the original on 28 November 2020.
 ^ "Hayal Köseoğlu sinirden zıpladı! Arkadaşına tokat attı - Son Dakika Magazin Haberleri". CNN Türk. Archived from the original on 22 June 2020.
 ^ "Hayal Köseoğlu selülitleriyle sosyal medyanın diline düştü! Plajda görüntülenen Hayal Köseoğlu'nun agrasif halleri dikkat çekti!". Sabah. Archived from the original on 23 June 2020.
 ^ "Hayal Köseoğlu'ndan samimi açıklamalar - Son Dakika Magazin Haberleri". CNN Türk. Archived from the original on 18 June 2020.
 ^ "Hayal Köseoğlu: Sizin haddinize değil". Sözcü. Archived from the original on 30 July 2020.

External links 
 
 

1992 births
Living people
Actresses from Istanbul
Istanbul Aydın University alumni
Turkish film actresses
Turkish television actresses